Matthew Nebeker (born June 16, 1986) is an American professional wrestler, better known by the ring name Ethan H. D..

Professional wrestling career 
Ethan attended in Harley Race's annual week long camp in October 2011. In addition, he also performed at the World League Wrestling show that following Saturday in a six-man tag pitting Ryan Drago, Jeff Strong, and Dustin Bozworth against himself, Bradley Charles, and Lee Walker.

H. D. debuted for the West Coast Wrestling Connection on September 24, 2011, teaming with Eric Right against Paynefully Large in an unsuccessful attempt to win the WCWC Tag Team Championships. H. D. would spend the next year working his way up the card eventually winning the WCWC Championship on January 6, 2013 from Nick Madrid in an "I Quit" match. He then spent the rest of the year defending the championship against wrestlers like Ryan Taylor, Gangrel, and "Hotshot" Danny Duggan. When the WCWC started broadcasting weekly episodes on KPTV, HD and Mike Santiago were thrust into a feud with Gangrel and Mikey O'Shea over the WCWC Tag Team Championships culminating in a Tables, Ladders, and Chairs match in the main event of one particular episode. he recently made his return to the West Coast Wrestling Connection where he's currently wrestling for the Pacific Northwest title tournament. He also dumped Kate Karny upon his return as well.

H. D. debuted in Elite Canadian Championship Wrestling on January 27, 2012 as a member of Natural Selection teaming with Bishop in a losing effort to Sid Sylum and Azeem the Dream. During 2012 he made it to the finals of a tournament to crown a new ECCW Champion before falling to Sid Sylum. Following that he was eliminated in the opening round of the 2012 Pacific Cup, and eliminated in the Six Way Shoot Out round of the Shooting Star Six tournament. The summer of 2013 saw H. D. team up with Mike Santiago to form the Amerikan Gunz who successfully defeated the Bollywood Boyz to win their first tag team championship and kickstart a feud between the two teams. The Bollywood Boyz would eventually win the titles back before losing them back to the Gunz at ECCW's first Ballroom Brawl event in the Commodore Ballroom. The war between the two teams ended on April 12, 2014 in a steel cage match in Vancouver, BC in front of a sold out crowd with the Bollywood Boyz regaining the championships. At ECCW's second Ballroom Brawl event. H. D. pinned Colt Cabana as part of a triple threat elimination match which was won by El Phantasmo.

In September 2012; Ethan was invited to, and attended a tryout at WWE's developmental facilities.

H. D. made his debut for Championship Wrestling from Hollywood on March 17, 2013 successfully teaming with Erik Baeden against Ryan J. Morals and Ian Wyze. Later that year, H. D. faced off against Joey Ryan in a failed attempt to win Ryan's CWFH Mav TV Championship. In June 2014, H. D. made it to the final four of the Red Carpet Rumble before being eliminated by X-Pac. Following the Rumble, H. D. joined up with Eric Cross to form a tag team called #TheList.

On July 4, 2015; Ethan made his Paragon Pro Wrestling debut becoming runner-up to Caleb Konley in a number one contenders battle royal on PPW's national television debut.

On July 11, 2015; Ethan faced Artemis Spencer, Billy Suede, and Nicole Matthews in a four-way ladder match in the main event of ECCW's Ballroom Brawl 4. The match was for both the ECCW and Canadian Heavyweight Championships. Ultimately the contest was won by Spencer after interference from Shayna Baszler On March 12, 2016; H. D. defeated Artemis Spencer and Billy Suede in the 2016 Pacific Cup finals to become the first American to win the ECCW Pacific Cup. The following month on April 9, 2016; Ethan went on to defeat Artemis Spencer to capture the NWA Canadian Heavyweight Championship for the first time.

H. D. made his debut on the inaugural DEFY Wrestling show in 2017, losing to Mike Santiago. He returned nine months at DEFY Kings Among Men reforming the Amerikan Gunz with Mike Santiago. They would then beat Violence Unlimited (Brody King and Tyler Bateman) in a tournament final at DEFY Club to become the first ever DEFY Tag Team 8XGP Champions, holding the titles for a total of 133 days. They would eventually lose the titles to the One Percent (Royce Issacs and Jorel Nelson) at DEFY Never Dies on January 19, 2019.

Championships and accomplishments 
 DEFY Wrestling
DEFY Tag Team 8XGP Championship (1 time) - with Mike Santiago
 DOA Pro Wrestling
 DOA Heavyweight Championship (1 time, current)
 DOA Pure Wrestling Championship  (1 time)
 DOA Tag Team Championship (2 times) - with Aaron Bolo (1) and Mike Santiago (1)
 Elite Canadian Championship Wrestling
 ECCW Tag Team Championship (2 times) - with Mike Santiago
 NWA Canadian Heavyweight Championship (1 time)
 ECCW Pacific Cup (2016)
 Pro Wrestling Illustrated
PWI ranked him #287 of the 500 best singles wrestlers of the year in the PWI 500 in 2014
 West Coast Wrestling Connection
 WCWC Pacific Northwest Championship (2 time)
 WCWC Tag Team Championship (4 times) - with Mike Santiago

References

External links
 
 

1986 births
American male professional wrestlers
Living people
People from Chicago
Professional wrestlers from Illinois
NWA Canadian Heavyweight Champions